There Will Be a Light is a gospel album by Ben Harper and The Blind Boys of Alabama, released in 2004. It is Harper's sixth album.

This album earned a Grammy award for Best Gospel album while Harper also won a Grammy for the track, "11th Commandment".

Track listing
All songs written by Ben Harper except as noted.
"Take My Hand" – 3:54
"Wicked Man" – 3:33
"Where Could I Go" (Marc Ford, Ben Harper, Jason Yates) – 4:09
"Church House Steps" – 4:46
"11th Commandment" (Harper, The Blind Boys of Alabama) – 1:34
"Well, Well, Well" (Bob Dylan, Danny O'Keefe) – 3:15
"Picture of Jesus" – 3:45
"Satisfied Mind" (Red Hayes, Jack Rhodes) – 3:15
"Mother Pray" (James Rowe, John W. Vaughan) – 3:00
"There Will Be a Light" – 3:22
"Church on Time" – 4:17

Personnel
Ben Harper & the Innocent Criminals
Bobby Butler
Oliver Charles
Rock Deadrick
Clarence Fountain
Ricke McKinnie
Leon Mobley
Juan Nelson
Tracie Pierce
Michael Ward
Joe "Jackson Joe" Williams
Jason Yates
Marc Ford

Production
Producer: Ben Harper & the Innocent Criminals
Executive producer: Chris Goldsmith
Engineers: Mike Glines, Jimmy Hoyson
Mixing: Jimmy Hoyson
Arranger: Ben Harper & the Innocent Criminals
Design: Jason Yates
Artwork: Jason Yates
Photography: Steve Sherman

Charts

Weekly charts

Year-end charts

Certifications and sales

References

Ben Harper albums
The Blind Boys of Alabama albums
2004 albums
Gospel albums by American artists
Virgin Records albums